Iran participated in the ninth Winter Paralympics in Turin, Italy.

Competitors

Results by event

Alpine skiing 

Men's standing

External links
Torino 2006 Paralympic Games
International Paralympic Committee

2006
Nations at the 2006 Winter Paralympics
Winter Paralympics